The Last Word is a 1975 West German comedy drama film written and directed by Robert van Ackeren, and starring Delphine Seyrig, Barry Foster, Peter Hall, Kirstie Pooley and Udo Kier.

Cast

External links

1975 films
1975 comedy-drama films
German comedy-drama films
West German films
1970s German-language films
English-language German films
Adultery in films
Films about businesspeople
1970s business films
Constantin Film films
Films directed by Robert van Ackeren
1975 comedy films
1975 drama films
1970s German films